Puleksenija Jovanovska is a Macedonian professional karateka. She represents North Macedonia internationally.

Career
She is European bronze medalist in European Karate Championships (Continental Championship) and Balkan gold medalist in U-21 Individual Kata category and she also won medals in the World Karate Federation recognised tournaments.
In 2021 she secured 11th place in the 56th European Karate Championships Karate Championships held at Croatia.

Achievements 
She competed at the World Olympic Qualification Tournament held in Paris, France hoping to qualify for  2020 Summer Olympics in Tokyo, Japan She did not qualify at this tournament but she was able to qualify after the allocation of  Tripartite Commission Invitation places and the reassignment of the last qualifying spots.

Now she will represent North Macedonia in Women's kata  at the Karate competition of the 2020 Summer Olympics in Tokyo, Japan.

References 

Living people
Place of birth missing (living people)
Macedonian female karateka
Karateka at the 2020 Summer Olympics
1993 births